Tympanocryptis macra, the savannah earless dragon, is a species of agama found in northernWestern Australia and the Northern Territory. It was described originally as Tympanocryptis lineata macra in 1982 by Glen Milton Storr.

References

macra
Agamid lizards of Australia
Taxa named by Glen Milton Storr
Reptiles described in 1982